Rico is an incorporated small town in Dolores County, Colorado, United States. It was settled in 1879 as a silver mining center in the Pioneer Mining District; today it functions as a historic and tourism site. The population was 265 at the 2010 census, up from 205 at the 2000 census. Its current form of government is that of a home rule municipality.

Rico is a name derived from Spanish meaning "rich".

Geography
Rico is located in eastern Dolores County at  (37.692095, -108.030839), in the valley of the Dolores River. Colorado State Highway 145 passes through the town as it follows the river, leading southwest  to Cortez and northeast over Lizard Head Pass  to Telluride.

Climate
Rico experiences an  alpine subarctic climate (Köppen climate classification Dfc) with long, cold, very snowy winters and short, cool summers due to the high altitude and high precipitation year-round due to orographic lift.

Demographics

As of the census of 2000, there were 205 people, 104 households, and 47 families residing in the town. The racial makeup of the town was 92.68% White, 2.93% Native American, 1.95% Asian, 0.98% from other races, and 1.46% from two or more races. Hispanic or Latino of any race were 2.93% of the population.

There were 104 households, out of which 18.3% had children under the age of 18 living with them, 37.5% were married couples living together, 4.8% had a female householder with no husband present, and 54.8% were non-families. 39.4% of all households were made up of individuals, and 3.8% had someone living alone who was 65 years of age or older.  The average household size was 1.97 and the average family size was 2.62.

In the town, the population was spread out, with 15.1% under the age of 18, 8.8% from 18 to 24, 50.7% from 25 to 44, 22.0% from 45 to 64, and 3.4% who were 65 years of age or older.  The median age was 35 years. For every 100 females, there were 144.0 males.  For every 100 females age 18 and over, there were 148.6 males.

The median income for a household in the town was $36,667, and the median income for a family was $55,625. Males had a median income of $31,806 versus $23,750 for females. The per capita income for the town was $21,920.  About 13.2% of families and 13.8% of the population were below the poverty line, including 23.3% of those under the age of eighteen and none of those 65 or over.

Transportation
Rico is part of Colorado's Bustang network. It is on the Durango-Grand Junction Outrider line.

See also

Outline of Colorado
Index of Colorado-related articles
State of Colorado
Colorado cities and towns
Colorado municipalities
Colorado counties
Dolores County, Colorado
San Juan Mountains
San Juan Skyway

References

External links

Town of Rico official website
CDOT map of the Town of Rico
Marty Durlin, "A Rico Renaissance", High Country News, February 18, 2008

Towns in Dolores County, Colorado
Towns in Colorado
Former county seats in Colorado